Krawang is a common misspelling of Karawang. Karawang itself may refer to:
 The Karawang Regency on the island of Java
 The city of Karawang located in the same regency